An Amateur Devil is a 1920 American silent comedy film directed by Maurice Campbell and written by Douglas Bronston based upon the short story "Wanted: A Blemish" by Henry J. Buxton and Jessie Henderson. The film stars Bryant Washburn, Charles Wingate, Ann May, Sidney Bracey, Graham Pettie, and Anna Dodge. The film was released on December 19, 1920, by Paramount Pictures. It is not known whether the film currently survives.

Plot
As described in a film magazine, Carver Endicott (Washburn), born into wealth, has a sweetheart Margaret (May) who has become boresome to him. To stimulate his interest, his father (Wingate), a dashing old beau, pretends an affection for the young woman. She, in exasperation, accepts his proposal. The plan works and rouses Carver to come up with a scheme of besmirching the family name to prevent the wedding. He poses as a hired farmhand, a dishwasher, and then a hotel bus boy. In the latter capacity he invites the attention of a young musical queen (Mayo). It turns out that she is the former wife of his valet. His relationship with his sweetheart Margaret is resumed, and they receive a telegram announcing his father's marriage to the actress.

Cast
Bryant Washburn as Carver Endicott
Charles Wingate as His Father
Ann May as	His Sweetheart
Sidney Bracey as His Valet
Graham Pettie as Farmer Brown
Anna Dodge as Mrs. Brown 
Christine Mayo as A Musical Comedy Star
Norris Johnson as Her Daughter

References

External links 

 

1920 films
1920s English-language films
Silent American comedy films
1920 comedy films
Paramount Pictures films
American black-and-white films
American silent feature films
Films directed by Maurice Campbell
1920s American films